Ang Forever Ko'y Ikaw (International title: Close to You / ) is a 2018 Philippine television drama romance comedy series broadcast by GMA Network. Directed by Tata Betita, it stars Camille Prats and Neil Ryan Sese. It premiered on March 12, 2018 on the network's afternoon line up. The series concluded on May 4, 2018 with a total of 38 episodes. It was replaced by My Guitar Princess in its timeslot.

The series is streaming online on YouTube.

Premise
The story revolves around Ginny and Lance, single parents who are still both attached to their past while hoping for a new chance at love. Their lives will start to intertwine with each other.

Cast and characters

Lead cast
 Camille Prats as Maria Virginia "Ginny  Dyosabel" Peche-Capurian/Dimaigue
 Neil Ryan Sese as Lance "Driveucrazy / Nuno Sa Puso" Dimaigue

Supporting cast
 Ayra Mariano as Marione Capurian
 Bruno Gabriel as Benjamin "Benjie" Dimaigue
 Cai Cortez as Marissa "Issa / Queenie" Mercado-Lastimosa
 Archie Alemania as Marco "Maoy" Lastimosa
 Odette Khan as Taneneng Capurian
 Rubi Rubi as Eew 
 Rener Concepcion as Yak
 Adrian Pascual as Dax
 Joshua Jacobe as Jigs
 Kelvin Miranda as Raki
 Jude Paolo Diangson as Gino

Guest cast
 Aubrey Miles as Maya Reyes
 Arthur Solinap as Mario Capurian
 Bryan Benedict as Geraldo Roque
 Kyle Vergara as Mac / Nerdy
 Aira Bermudez as Honey Darling
 Princess Guevarra as Cheska
 Mel Kimura as Madam Seer
 Arianne Bautista as Margaret 
 Ash Ortega as Liezel
 Marika Sasaki as Diane
 Mega Unciano as Gerry
 Carlos Agassi as Andrew

Episodes

March 2018

April 2018

May 2018

Ratings
According to AGB Nielsen Philippines' Nationwide Urban Television Audience Measurement People in television homes, the pilot episode of Ang Forever Ko'y Ikaw earned a 4.3% rating.

References

External links
 
 

2018 Philippine television series debuts
2018 Philippine television series endings
Filipino-language television shows
GMA Network drama series
Philippine romantic comedy television series
Television shows set in the Philippines